"Love Don't Love You" is a song by American R&B/pop vocal group En Vogue, released as the final single from their second album, Funky Divas (1992). It was released in 1993 and became the group's fifth consecutive top-40 single from the album in the United States. The song is led by Terry Ellis and Cindy Herron.

Critical reception
AllMusic editor Jose F. Promis described "Love Don't Love You" as "jazzy". Larry Flick from Billboard commented, "There just ain't no stoppin' these funky divas", adding that the new single "is a bit more aggressive and catchy than the previous "Give It Up, Turn It Loose". Syncopated funk beats clip at an easy pace, supporting an intricate and expectedly harmonious vocal arrangement." Randy Clark from Cashbox viewed it as a "particular scantily-arranged cut". Dave Sholin from the Gavin Report complimented its "dynamic production, incredible harmonies and great material [that] make an unbeatable formula." A reviewer from Music & Media said, "Funk, rock, pop, jazz, well ladies, what's it gonna be this time? The "funky divas of all trades" go swing beat, with lovely results of course." 

Alan Jones from Music Week wrote that they "return with a nagging jack swing track that will remind Jade what they're up against in the battle of the funky divas." He added, "The singing is as good as it gets, but some of the mixes are a bit on the flabby side, and probably diminish rather than broaden its appeal." Pop Rescue stated that the vocals "are beautiful, and sit perfectly alongside the beats and bassline." They concluded, "It’s brilliant." Pete Stanton from Smash Hits gave the song three out of five, declaring it as a "funky number that oozes something extremely naughty and tasty. Not as powerful as the last few singles but still as groove-filled as you'd expect from the Divas." Cheo H. Coker from Stanford Daily felt that it "isn't bad, but just doesn't pack as much punch as other cuts on the effort."

Track list and formats

 US cassette single
A. "Love Don't Love You"  – 3:56
B. "Yesterday"  – 2:30

 European CD maxi-single (Remixes)
 "Love Don't Love You (Remix Edit 1) – 4:07
 "Love Don't Love You (Remix 1) – 5:56
 "Love Don't Love You (Remix 2) – 5:52
 "It Ain't Over Till The Fat Lady Sings" – 4:12

 UK CD single
 "Love Don't Love You (Remix 1) – 5:54
 "Love Don't Love You (Remix 2) – 5:51
 "Love Don't Love You (Remix Dub) – 3:54
 "Love Don't Love You (Remix Edit 1) – 4:07
 "Love Don't Love You" (LP Version) – 3:56

 US CD single
 "Love Don't Love You" (Remix Edit 1) – 4:03
 "Love Don't Love You" (Remix Edit 2) – 4:04
 "Love Don't Love You" (LP Version) – 3:54

Personnel
 Lead vocals, background vocals – Terry Ellis, Cindy Herron
 Background vocals – Cindy Herron, Terry Ellis, Maxine Jones, Dawn Robinson
 Producer, Arranger – Denzil Foster & Thomas McElroy
 Executive-Producer – Thomas McElroy & Denzil Foster 
 Drum Programming – Antoine "Doc" Judkins
 Engineer – Conley Abrams
 Remix producer – Darren "Nitro" Clowers

Charts

Release history

References

1992 songs
1993 singles
East West Records singles
En Vogue songs
New jack swing songs
Songs written by Thomas McElroy
Songs written by Denzil Foster